"The Show Must Go On, Probably?" is the first episode of the second season of the American dark comedy crime television series Barry. It is the 9th overall episode of the series and was written by series creators Alec Berg and Bill Hader, and directed by Hiro Murai. It was first broadcast on HBO in the United States on March 31, 2019.

The series follows Barry Berkman, a hitman from Cleveland who travels to Los Angeles to kill someone but finds himself joining an acting class taught by Gene Cousineau, where he meets aspiring actress Sally Reed and begins to question his path in life as he deals with his criminal associates such as Monroe Fuches and NoHo Hank. In the episode, Barry wants to move on with his life after the events at the lake house. However, Gene is grief-stricken after Moss' "disappearance" and considers ending the class. Meanwhile, NoHo Hank sees his life threatened when Cristobal collaborates with their rival and is also threatened by his family back in Chechnya.

According to Nielsen Media Research, the episode was seen by an estimated 0.532 million household viewers and gained a 0.2 ratings share among adults aged 18–49. The episode received critical acclaim, with critics praising the series' new direction following the first season, performances and darker tone.

Plot
In Cleveland, a hitman (Shaughn Buchholz) enters an apartment, killing the two men inside before attempting to open a safe. When his code doesn't work, he tries to shoot the safe in frustration, only for the bullet to recoil and hit him in the leg. The hitman returns to the motel where his employer, Fuches (Stephen Root), is waiting with their client, who only wanted the contents of the safe and is aghast to learn of the killings. The police arrive and kill the hitman, while the client panics and jumps out a window to his own death. Fuches surrenders.

Back in Los Angeles, Barry (Bill Hader) prepares for a rehearsal of The Front Page, but the class is apathetic, as Gene (Henry Winkler) is absent, grief-stricken after Moss' "disappearance." Barry decides to direct the play himself, unwilling to let the next day's performance be cancelled. Meanwhile, Hank (Anthony Carrigan) has been enjoying his collaboration with Cristobal Sifuentes (Michael Irby) and the Bolivians. However, he's upset when Cristobal forms an alliance with Esther (Patricia Fa'asua), the leader of the rival Burmese mafia. 

Barry visits Gene at his house at the same time that Moss' partner, Loach (John Pirruccello), informs Gene that his cabin is no longer an active crime scene, and Moss' case will be closed due to the lack of leads in her disappearance. Barry wants Gene to come back to the class, but he refuses, even contemplating suicide. 

Hank receives a death threat from his family back in Chechnya, who believe the Bolivians to be responsible for killing Goran. He goes to visit Barry at his new job at Lululemon, telling him he lied to the Chechens that Esther had Goran killed to protect Barry. He asks Barry to help him kill Esther, but he refuses. 

That night, as the class prepares to perform, Gene arrives and cancels the play. Afterward, he informs the class that he wants to shut down the class permanently. When Barry begs him to continue, suggesting the class could help Gene work through his grief, Gene bitterly says that talking about Moss would be like Barry opening up about the first time he killed someone. Barry then confesses how during his service in Afghanistan, he spotted a possible combatant while surveying with his partner Albert (James Hiroyuki Liao). Barry coolly killed the man and then two others from an impressive distance. As Barry talks, Gene has actors act out along with his narration. The actors portray him as being full of remorse over the killings while his partner consoles him. When asked, Barry says their interpretation is accurate, when in reality the other Marines congratulated and celebrated with him. Gene is convinced to continue with the class.

Sally (Sarah Goldberg) praises Barry for his bravery, but while he wants to spend time with her, her schedule is packed. Hank then confronts Barry again in the parking lot, this time much more serious than before. He asserts that Barry owes him for saving his life, and demands that he kill Esther, threatening to tell his family the truth about Goran and then kill him and the class if he refuses. Barry agrees to help. 

The police check Fuches' DNA, which matches a tooth the LAPD found at the scene of Goran's murder. Loach is informed of this by his new partner, Mae Dunn (Sarah Burns). Investigating Fuches, Loach quickly connects him to Barry. He stares at the image of the silhouetted man from the lipstick camera, realizing that Barry is the killer.

Production

Development
In March 2019, the episode's title was revealed as "The Show Must Go On, Probably?" and it was announced that series creators Alec Berg and Bill Hader had written the episode while Hiro Murai had directed it. This was Berg's fourth writing credit, Hader's fourth writing credit, and Murai's third directing credit.

Writing
The writers considered many possible scenarios for the opening scene, with one idea including the revelation of Barry's actions after the woods. Staff writer Liz Sarnoff suggested ignoring that and explore new concepts for the season. Bill Hader brought up many story beats, which included Fuches' tooth, Loach's new partner and Fuches' new hitman. Sarnoff then suggested starting the season with Fuches' new hitman and his failed hit. That way, the story could be connected to Fuches' tooth through his arrest, culminating in Loach's discovery of Barry. The writers thought that connecting Fuches to Barry just because they were in Cleveland wouldn't work, so they added Loach staring at the photo from the lipstick camera.

Reception

Viewers
The episode was watched by 0.532 million viewers, earning a 0.2 in the 18-49 rating demographics on the Nielson ratings scale. This means that 0.2 percent of all households with televisions watched the episode. This was a slight decrease from the previous episode, which was watched by 0.548 million viewers with a 0.2 in the 18-49 demographics.

Critical reviews
"The Show Must Go On, Probably?" received critical acclaim. Vikram Murthi of The A.V. Club gave the episode an "A" and wrote, "I had my own doubts about Barrys sustainability, mostly because its premise lends itself to the possibility of retreading the same material. There's a version of Barry that could essentially replicate its first season again and again until everyone becomes bored, and it would still do very well. There's always the fear that a series will be content with being in neutral rather than pushing itself to different territory. Luckily, my skepticism evaporated almost immediately after watching tonight’s cold open." 

Alan Sepinwall of Rolling Stone wrote, "The return of HBO's dark comedy about a hitman-turned-actor highlights a common problem in modern TV: series that are perfectly built for one season but come back for more anyway." Ben Travers of IndieWire wrote, "The most biting gags often grow from the gloomiest corners of the soul, but what Hader and Berg are doing with Barry isn't focused on sharpening their fangs; they're not setting up laughs through Barry's descent, so much as they're using them to coax us into analyzing one of television's more challenging perspectives. Their interest lies in their lead, and so does the audience's. Barry Berkman is on the verge of becoming the next Walter White, and Barry could very well go the Breaking Bad route if it wants to — that's how dark the series is getting, and it's not a front. It's really, really good. Get ready." 

Nick Harley of Den of Geek gave the episode a 4 star rating out of 5 and wrote, "The season finale of Barrys first outing was satisfying and complete enough to serve as a series finale, but here, Barry resets the table effortlessly, introducing new threats and shades to characters while still having a masterful hold over the show's disparate tone. I haven't anticipated the return of a show this much in quite some time, and thankfully, Barry delivers from the episode's very first moments. If things got heavy and complicated for Barry last year, then by the looks of it, he better buckle up." Jen Chaney of Vulture wrote, "Barry, like the series that shares his name, is still in a dark place this season. While the wannabe actor might not want to hear this, that's a place that suits him, and Barry, just perfectly."

References

External links
 "The Show Must Go On, Probably?" at HBO
 

Barry (TV series) episodes
2019 American television episodes
Television episodes written by Bill Hader
Television episodes directed by Hiro Murai